The M134 Minigun is an American six-barrel rotary machine gun.

Minigun may also refer to:

 Hua Qing minigun, a Chinese rotary machine gun
 XM133 Minigun, an American rotary machine gun

See also
 GAU-19
 Glagolev-Shipunov-Gryazev GShG-7.62
 XM214 Microgun